Human Rights League or League for Human Rights may refer to:

Asia
 Women’s League for Human Rights, India

Africa
 Algerian League for Human Rights (LADH)
 Chadian League for Human Rights (LTDH)
 Human Rights League of the Horn of Africa (HRLHA)
 Ivorian League for Human Rights (LIDHO) or (LIDO)
 League for Human Rights (Benin)
 League for Human Rights (Nigeria)
 Libyan League for Human Rights
 Mozambican League for Human Rights
 Togolese League for Human Rights (LTDH)
 Tunisian Human Rights League (LTDH)
 Zairian League for Human Rights

Europe
 Austrian League for Human Rights
 Belarus Republican League for Human Rights
 Bulgarian League for Human Rights (BLHR)
 Bund für Menschenrecht (BfM; disbanded)
 Dutch League for Human Rights (LVRM)
 European League for Human Rights (AEDH)
 Finnish League for Human Rights (FLHR)
 German League for Human Rights
 (1923–1933), German homosexual organization
 Human Rights League (Czech Republic)
 Human Rights League (Dutch-speaking Belgium)
 Human Rights League (France)
 Human Rights League (French-speaking Belgium)
 Hungarian League for Human Rights
 International Federation of Human Rights (FIDH), established 1922, headquartered in Paris
 League for Human Rights (London)
 

Mediterranean and Middle East
 Citizens League for Human Rights, Greek web site
 Hellenic League for Human Rights (LHDH) or (HLHR)
 Iranian League for Human Rights (FIDH)
 Iraqi Humanitarian League for Human Rights
 Israeli League for Human Rights

North America
 International League for Human Rights (ILHR), founded in 1942, based in New York
 League for Human Rights (Cleveland, OH)
 League for Human Rights of B'nai Brith Canada
 Mexican League for Human Rights

South America
 Argentine Human Rights League Foundation (FLADH)
 Argentine League for Human Rights (LADH, Spanish)